Waddon is a ward in the London Borough of Croydon. covering most of the Waddon area and parts of South Croydon, Haling Park and Old Town. The new ward gained territory from Broad Green, and lost some residences to South Croydon and Purley Oaks and Riddlesdown wards as a result of the review. The first election since the boundary changes was on 3 May 2018 as part of the 2018 local elections.. The Labour councillors held all 3 seats.

List of Councillors

Mayoral election results 
Below are the results for the candidate which received the highest share of the popular vote in the ward at each mayoral election.

Ward Results

2018 to present

2002 to 2018

The by-election was called following the death of Cllr. Jonathan M. Driver.

1978 to 2002

The by-election was called following the resignation of Cllr. Ann A. Allan.

1964 to 1978

References 

Wards of the London Borough of Croydon